The Marshall Heights Line, designated Route U5 & U6, are daily bus routes operated by the Washington Metropolitan Area Transit Authority between Minnesota Avenue station of the Orange Line of the Washington Metro and Marshall Heights via Lincoln Heights. Both lines operate every 20-30 minutes at all times. Trips take roughly 30 minutes for both routes.

Route Description
Routes U5 and U6 provide service in Northeast and Southeast Washington in Marshall Heights, Lincoln Heights, Benning Heights, and Greenway via Minnesota Avenue, Ridge Road, Texas Avenue, and East Capitol Street.

Routes U5 and U6 operates out of Southern Avenue Annex during the weekdays and

History

U5 & U6 originally operated as part of the "Mayfair-Marshall Heights" D.C. Transit System Bus Line. U5 & U6 eventually became WMATA Metrobus Routes on February 4, 1973, when WMATA acquired all four bus companies that operated throughout the Washington D.C. Metropolitan Area and merged them all together to form its own, "Metrobus" System while keeping their same routing.

On December 3, 1978, both routes U5 and U6 went through a minor rerouting change, to divert into the newly opened Minnesota Avenue station.

On November 22, 1980, both routes U5 and U6 began serving Benning Road station. Both U5 & U6 would serve the station at the intersection of East Capitol Street NE & Benning Road NE/SE.

In WMATA's FY2015, it was proposed to shorten routes U5 and U6 at Minnesota Avenue station having Mayfair service replaced by a new route U1. The reasons were to improve reliability of service by operating shorter routes, create a better balance of capacity and demand throughout the line, and performance measures has an on-time performance is 78 percent compared to the target of 81 percent.

The study was brought up again during WMATA's FY2019 budget. Routes U5 and U6 would end at Minnesota Avenue station still with Mayfair service replaced by route U7. This was to improve service reliability and on-time performance by shortening the routes, create a better balance of capacity and customer demand on routes U5, U6, and U7, recommended in the 2014 U and V Lines Service Evaluation Study, and respond to Minnesota Avenue NE construction conclusion. Performance measures go as the following:

On June 24, 2018, Route U5 and U6 discontinued service to Mayfair & Parkside being replaced by extended route U7. All trips now terminate at Minnesota Avenue station. The line was also renamed from "Mayfair–Marshall Heights Line" to "Marshall Heights Line."

During the COVID-19 pandemic, Route U5 and U6 was reduced to operate on its Saturday supplemental schedule during the weekdays beginning on March 16, 2020. On March 18, 2020, the line was further reduced to operate on its Sunday schedule. Weekend service was later suspended on March 21, 2020. Additional service and weekend service was restored on August 23, 2020.

In February 2021 during the FY2022 budget, WMATA proposed to eliminate the U5 and U6 and replace it with a modified 96 and Route V2 if WMATA does not get any federal funding.

Incidents
 On November 13, 2011, at around 6:30 AM, a man was shot twice on a U6 bus along 37th Street and Ridge Road. The victim was taken to a local hospital.
 On May 3, 2016, 30-year-old Keith James Loving hijacked a U6 bus along Minnesota and Nannie Helen Burroughs Avenues with needle nose pliers and drove the bus into a gas station parking lot killing 40-year-old Anthony Payne. Police later apprehend Loving and was later arrested and charged with murder. The U6 driver suffered minor back injuries while no passengers were injured. Keith Loving was later sentenced to 21 years in jail.

References

U5